McNally High School is a high school located in the Forest Heights neighborhood in Edmonton, Alberta, Canada. It is operated by the Edmonton Public Schools system. The school is named after former Alberta Deputy Minister of Education and University of Alberta chancellor George Fred McNally.

Programs of study

International Baccalaureate
McNally offers the International Baccalaureate Diploma Program in addition to the Alberta education curriculum. Having a diploma graduating class normally greater than forty students a year, McNally has one of the largest international baccalaureate classes in Alberta. However, this is often attributed to the medium population base of the school, with about 300 students enrolled in the diploma program and 200 students enrolled in the certificate program each year.  McNally currently offers international baccalaureate courses in biology, computer science, English, history, physics, visual arts, chemistry, French, Spanish, mathematics, Mandarin, music, and math studies.

Career and Technology Studies
The school offers a variety of programs aimed to help students develop skills for employment after graduation. These include photography, computer programming and animation, web design, communication technology, construction, design studies, and culinary arts. Preparatory courses in culinary arts are offered at the school, allowing students to leave high school ready for a career in these areas.

Building
While the building itself is not new, it has undergone many upgrades and repairs in recent years, including new lockers throughout the school, new bathrooms, all the classrooms were painted, and the phys education office and girls' change rooms were renovated. The school has separate labs for all the sciences, including a physics lab, a biology lab, a chemistry lab and three computer labs. McNally is dedicated to athletics, and as a result, there are two gyms, a fitness center and a new dance facility. There is also a large drama room and multiple music / choral rooms.

Athletics
The following teams are available at McNally High School.
 Badminton
 Cheerleading
 Cross Country Running
 Rugby
 Curling
 Golf
 Basketball
 Football
 Soccer
 Swimming
 Track & Field
 Volleyball
 Wrestling

Notable alumni

Shawn Belle – hockey player, Colorado Avalanche
Jay Bouwmeester – hockey player, St. Louis Blues
Mark Fistric – hockey player, Edmonton Oilers
Cheryl Gibson – Olympic silver medalist
Luther Hakunavanhu - Football player, Calgary Stampeders
Jens Lindemann – trumpet player
Janice Rhea Reimer – former mayor of Edmonton
Tomáš Vincour- hockey player, Dallas Stars
David Bissett- Olympic Bronze medalist (2010 4-man Bobsleigh)

Extra-curricular activities
Programs run by students, for students, are important and widespread and give students the opportunity to organize events such as bike-a-thon, pancake breakfast, and H-Fest.

McNally is one of the few schools in Edmonton that does not have a student union. Rather than a small group of students leading the school events, McNally prefers to hold youth engagement focus groups, where randomly-selected students come together to give feedback on various topics, which is compiled and presented to faculty and administration who will listen to concerns and take action.

Clubs
Many clubs are available at McNally, with plenty of opportunities to start new clubs or associations.

 Best Buddies
 Big Brothers Big Sisters mentoring program
 Cappies (Critics and Awards Program)
 Citadel Theatre student's club
 Eco club
 Gaming club
 Global Opportunities (GO) club
 Gay-Straight Alliance (G.S.A.)
 Grad council
 Hip Hop Collective
 Math Homework Club 
 McNally Assists Students Serving in Volunteer Experiences (M.A.S.S.I.V.E.)
 McNally International club
 Multi-media club
 Me to We
 Reach for the Top
 Rotary club 
 Running club
 Science Olympics
 Ski club
 Speak Up, Write Down (Speech, Debate, and Writing)
 Triple C (Chinese Culture Club)
 Varsity Council
 Yearbook committee
 Youth Engagement Focus Groups

Events
Bike-a-thon - a fundraising event for Kids with Cancer.
Walk for Water
30 Hour Famine
Pancake Breakfast
Global Vote On Poverty

2022 stabbing 

In the afternoon of April 8, 2022, a 16-year-old boy was stabbed outside of the school, and was rushed to hospital in life-threatening condition. He succumbed to his injuries and died one week later on April 15, 2022. The victim was later identified as Karanveer Sahota.

References

External links
McNally High School

High schools in Edmonton
International Baccalaureate schools in Alberta
Educational institutions in Canada with year of establishment missing